Felipe Rosas Sánchez (5 February 1910 – 17 June 1986) was a Mexican professional footballer, who was part of the Mexican soccer team in the 1930 FIFA World Cup played in Uruguay. He, with his brothers, Manuel Rosas and Juan Rosas, were footballers in the Atlante Futbol Club, from Mexico City, and as fellow goalkeeper Oscar Bonfiglio once wrote: "he was the best of us".

Honours
Mexico
Central American and Caribbean Games Gold Medal: 1935

References

External links

1910 births
1986 deaths
Mexican footballers
Mexico international footballers
Atlante F.C. footballers
1930 FIFA World Cup players
Central American and Caribbean Games gold medalists for Mexico
Competitors at the 1935 Central American and Caribbean Games
Association football midfielders
Central American and Caribbean Games medalists in football
20th-century Mexican people